Apostolos Papastamos (born 20 March 2001) is a Greek swimmer. He qualified to represent Greece at the 2020 Summer Olympics in both the men's 200 metre individual medley and the men's 400 metre individual medley.

References 

2001 births
Living people
Greek male swimmers
Male medley swimmers
Swimmers at the 2020 Summer Olympics
Olympic swimmers of Greece
Place of birth missing (living people)
21st-century Greek people
People from Chania (regional unit)